Södervärn is a neighbourhood of Malmö, situated in the Borough of Södra Innerstaden, Malmö Municipality, Skåne County, Sweden.

Södervärn is home to a bus station of the same name, serving as a major interchange for both regional and city buses.

References

Neighbourhoods of Malmö